A brass mill is a mill which processes brass. Brass mills are common in England; many date from long before the Industrial Revolution.

Examples of brass mills include
Brassmill (Ross on Wye)
Saltford Brass Mill

See also 
 Calamine brass
 Latten
 William Champion

Further reading 

Metallurgical facilities